The Donawerth was a 90-gun Suffren class ship of the line of the French Navy.

Her keel was laid in Lorient in 1827. She stayed abandoned in an unbuilt state for several years before being completed as a steam ship. She was eventually launched on 15 February 1854.

She took part in the Crimean War as a transport.

In 1860, she served off Beirut with Redoutable.

In 1868, she was renamed to Jean Bart, and used as a school ship.

She was again renamed to Cyclope in 1886, and eventually broken up in 1897.

Sources and references 
 Jean-Michel Roche, Dictionnaire des Bâtiments de la flotte de guerre française de Colbert à nos jours, tome I
 Les bâtiments ayant porté le nom de Jean Bart, netmarine.net

References

Ships of the line of the French Navy
1854 ships
Suffren-class ships of the line